Archive Corporation was a computer tape drive manufacturer, based in Costa Mesa, California, that was acquired by Conner Peripherals in 1993.

History
The company was founded in 1980 and based out of Costa Mesa, California. The company employed 3,367 in 1990 and reached revenues of US$293 million in that year, up from $79 million in 1986.

Of particular note are the Archive DDS tape drives produced for Silicon Graphics that could also read and write Digital Audio Tapes: the Archive Python 4320 and the Archive Peregrine 4326 (rebranded under Conner or Seagate).

Prior to this, Archive was a leading vendor of the very popular quarter-inch cartridge (QIC) format which was a popular distribution format for Unix workstations and servers. For example, software for the Sun-3 (running the Motorola 68K family) and the Sun-4 (based on SPARC processors) was most commonly distributed on QIC media before CD-ROMs became more cost-effective.  Archive was better known for their QIC drives.

Conner Peripherals acquired Archive in 1993.

Acquisitions 
In 1989, Archive acquired Maynard Electronics. The MaynStream brand of tape drives and software was maintained.

In March 1990, Archive acquired Cipher Data Products for $118 million. This included Cipher's subsidiary Irwin Magnetics.

References

External links 
 
 

1980 establishments in California
1993 disestablishments in California
1993 mergers and acquisitions
Companies based in Costa Mesa, California
Computer companies established in 1980
Computer companies disestablished in 1993
Defunct companies based in California
Defunct computer companies based in California
Defunct computer companies of the United States
Defunct computer hardware companies